Samuel Julius Gould (13 October 1924 – 4 December 2019) was Emeritus Professor of Sociology at the University of Nottingham.

After studying at Balliol College, Oxford, where he gained an MA in PPE,  he worked at Bletchley Park as a codebreaker.

Other positions 
 1981-2007 Chairman of trustees, Social Affairs Unit
 1993-4 Council of the United Synagogue

Publications 
 Dictionary of the Social Sciences (joint editor)
 Jewish Life in Modern Britain (joint editor)
 The Attack on Higher Education
 Jewish Commitment: A study in London

References

Sources
 Jewish Year Book, 2005, p. 249

1924 births
2019 deaths
English Jews
British sociologists
Academics from Liverpool
Academics of the University of Nottingham
Alumni of Balliol College, Oxford
Academics of the London School of Economics